Yan Aung Win (born 9 September 1992) is a footballer from Myanmar. He made his first appearance for the Myanmar national football team in 2010. He is the two-time Myanmar National League winner with Yangon United and bronze medalist with Myanmar U-23 in 2011 Southeast Asian Games. In 2013, he moved to Yadanarbon along with teammate Kaung Sithu. He is the first choice rightback for his club and national football team.

International goals

References 

1992 births
Living people
Sportspeople from Mandalay
Burmese footballers
Myanmar international footballers
Yangon United F.C. players
Yadanarbon F.C. players
Shan United F.C. players
Zeyashwemye F.C. players
Hanthawaddy United F.C. players
Association football fullbacks
Southeast Asian Games bronze medalists for Myanmar
Southeast Asian Games medalists in football
Competitors at the 2011 Southeast Asian Games